Good Hope Seminary High School is an all-girl private 
high school in the Western Cape. It was founded in 1873 by Reverend Andrew Murray.

References

External links
 

Schools in Cape Town